Meda Meeda Abbayi is a 2017 Telugu comedy thriller film directed by G. Prajith. This film stars Allari Naresh, and Nikhila Vimal in the lead roles. This is a remake of 2015 Malayalam film Oru Vadakkan Selfie directed by the same director.

Plot 
Srinu is an Engineering student who is struggling to pass all his subjects. His father runs a grocery shop. Srinu is aimless and likes to hang out with his friends Bandla Babji, Karthu and others. His parents ask him to look after the grocery store, but he wants to become a filmmaker. Meanwhile, a pretty girl named Sindhu comes into his life as a neighbor. Unable to take pressure from family, he decides to make a short film and upload it to internet hoping to get a lot of hits and becomes viral. However, they lose the camera when Babji accidentally leaves it in a stream after a booze party.

He decides to go to Hyderabad to try his luck in films without informing anyone. On his way to Hyderabad he runs into Sindhu again and tries to take a selfie with her and sends it to his friend Babji. He reaches Hyderabad and roam around the city for opportunities in films. He soon realizes that it is going to be a tough job and decides to return to his village. As soon as he arrives in the village, he is surrounded by his father and a group of villagers accusing him of eloping with Sindhu. Her father threatens him to tell the whereabouts of his daughter otherwise he would complain to the police. He pleads for his innocence but nobody listens. He calls up his friend Babji to know the actual reason for all the chaos. Babji reveals that he spread the news in the village that they both eloped when encountered with an unavoidable situation. They both escape to Hyderabad again to find Sindhu and bring her back to village to prove their innocence.

Srinu remembers Sindhu telling him that she was going for an interview at a company called Max Infotech. But they couldn't find her. Meanwhile, a police warrant is issued against them by the villagers for kidnapping Sindhu. They run into a private detective Yugandhar on one of their searching spree who offers his help finding her. Yugandhar finds her and brings her to his office. She reveals that she fled from home to escape a forcible marriage proposal arranged by her parents. She came to meet Hari Narayana, whom she met online. They never meet face to face. She claims that she is regularly chatting with Hari. Yugandhar finds out that Hari Narayana has actually committed suicide one year ago, however she does not believe them. She wants to find out the truth on her own. With the help of some of Hari's friends and acquaintances, they find out his native place. They travel to his native place and witnesses his one-year death anniversary proceedings.

Sindhu is shocked to know the truth and is heartbroken. Srinu consoles her and they travel back to Hyderabad. On the way, Srinu gets puzzled about Yugandhar on how he is able to get clues very quickly and question him. Yugandhar reveals himself to be a CBCID officer Naresh who is investigating a mass online cheating case by a person called pandian uday bhaskar in which Sindhu is also one of the victims. He was once a business partner of Hari and cheated him which caused him to commit suicide. Also, he was the one who is using Hari's account to chat with Sindhu. Finally, Naresh traps the culprit by posing as a girl and catch him. Srinu then lets Naresh to vent out his anger on Uday bhaskar  for cheating innocent girls as what he did to sindhu. Srinu is then shown walking to a nearby table and asking whether the man sitting there is Uday Bhaskar (Ravi babu). The movie ends with the man answering yes and Srinu hitting him over the head with a bottle and says to Naresh that whenever he needs him to break bottles just call him and went back to his home town with sindhu.

Cast 
 Allari Naresh as Srinu, an Engineering student
 Nikhila Vimal as Sindhu
 Srinivas Avasarala as detective Yugander / CBCID officer Naresh.
 Hyper Aadi as Bandla Babji
 Satyam Rajesh as Karthu
 Siva Reddy as tuition teacher
 Jeeva as village president
 Jayaprakash as Srinu's father
 Tulasi as Srinu's mother
 Sudha
 Ravi Prakash
 Ravi Babu as Panyam Uday Bhaskar (Special appearance)

Music 
The music for this film is composed by Shaan Rahman. This album has 5 tracks and all the songs from the original has been retained.
 Notlona Velu Pedithe
 Ekanthama Ekanthame
 Hyderabad Nagaram
 Ontari Manasa
 Kalam Agipodu

Release 
Despite receiving positive reviews it failed at box-office. Two months after its theatrical release, the film had a television premiere on Gemini TV on 25 November 2017.

References 

2010s Telugu-language films
Telugu remakes of Malayalam films
Indian comedy thriller films